The correspondence principle is a concept in quantum theory and relativity.

Correspondence principle may also refer to:
 Correspondence principle (sociology), correspondence between social class and available education
 In public finance, the principle that identifies the places where it is beneficial to provide public goods and services
 Correspondence principle (economics), the fact that determining the stability of an economic equilibrium corresponds to deriving results in comparative statics
One of the seven Principles cited in the esoteric book The Kybalion.